The Mid-Atlantic Rifle Conference (MAC) is a National Collegiate Athletic Association (NCAA) rifle-only conference. The MAC was established in 1978 for schools that sponsor NCAA sanctioned varsity rifle teams, but do not have rifle as a sponsored sport in their primary conferences, as well as for non-NCAA sanctioned collegiate club teams.

Members

Current members

Former members
Former members include:

 Akron
 Appalachian State
 Army
 Brandeis
 Columbia
 Cornell
 DePaul
 Drexel
 Duquesne
 Johns Hopkins
 Kings College
 Kutztown
 Lehigh University
 Mass Maritime
 Merchant Marine Academy
 Navy
 University of the Sciences in Philadelphia
 NJIT
 Norwich
 Penn
 Princeton
 St. John's
 Trinity College
 VMI
 Various ROTC teams from member schools

Champions
The conference sponsors championships in several different levels of competition, and has not held championship meets in every year.

See also
List of NCAA rifle programs
NCAA Rifle Championship

References

External links
 Conference website

College rifle conferences in the United States
NCAA conferences